Sidney Moor Heath (August 27, 1859 – April 3, 1919) was an American politician in the state of Washington. He served in the Washington House of Representatives from 1895 to 1897.

References

Republican Party members of the Washington House of Representatives
1859 births
1919 deaths
19th-century American politicians